Roy Poels (born 16 May 1972, Venray) is a Dutch judoka.

Achievements

See also
List of judo organizations#Netherlands
Sport in the Netherlands#Judo

References

External links

1972 births
Living people
Dutch male judoka
People from Venray
Sportspeople from Limburg (Netherlands)